Coleophora albens is a moth of the family Coleophoridae. It is found in Turkestan and Uzbekistan.

The larvae feed on Astragalus and Ammodendron species. They create a silky, massive, almost round case with a cover. It has smooth oblique wrinkles and the surface is smooth and lustrous. The cover only encloses the caudal end of case, which is down-curved. The valve is two-sided. The length of the case is 13–16 mm and it is whitish with yellow or cream tinge. Larvae can be found on the beginning of June and (after diapause) from the end of April to May.

References

albens
Moths described in 1973
Moths of Asia